Tanimbili (Tanibili), or Nyisunggu, is a nearly-extinct language spoken on the island of Utupua, in the easternmost province of the Solomon Islands.

Bibliography
.

References

Languages of the Solomon Islands
Temotu languages
Endangered Austronesian languages
Severely endangered languages